The West Yorkshire mass transit system, is a proposed transport system connecting the larger conurbations of West Yorkshire, England, with a central hub at Leeds. The city of Leeds is known to be the largest city in Western Europe without a light rail or metro-style system.

Background
Mass transit systems have been considered in the region before, mostly focussing on Leeds, which had a Supertram project gaining royal assent in 1993 - conventional tramways existed in Leeds up until 1959. The route was to have proceeded north from a point near to the old M621/M1 motorway junction into central Leeds as route 1, with extensions north to Headingley, and east to the St James area. By 2001, costings had increased to £487 million for the project, and by the time the project was cancelled by Alistair Darling in 2004, over £39 million had been spent developing the system.

A £250 million trolleybus system was also proposed, which was cancelled in 2016.

Development
When the Integrated Rail Plan was released in November 2021, it was revealed that the eastern leg of the HS2 project into Leeds was cancelled. Instead, a mass transit system, as proposed by the West Yorkshire Combined Authority, was given funding to progress. Some have labelled this as a "consolation prize", whilst it has been noted that Leeds is the largest city in western Europe without a metro-style system. The mass transit system aims to connect 675,000 people across the West Yorkshire region. Additionally, the HS3 line across the Pennines was cancelled on its Yorkshire section. Proponents had hoped that this would see a through line and station built in Bradford. In March 2022, the transport minister, Andrew Stephenson, stated that the passenger numbers of those travelling between Bradford and Manchester was so low compared to those travelling from Bradford to within West Yorkshire. This is why the UK government favoured a mass transit system and route upgrades, rather than building a new line.

In March 2022, £200 million was approved to bring the project forward, with an estimated value of £2 billion. However, the £200 million funding may be halved as £100 million may be allocated to investigate whether HS2 trains could travel to Leeds on conventional railway tracks. In September 2022, a new study, called "The Leeds Study", was launched to look at the integrated rail plan of West Yorkshire, with a focus on capacity at  railway station, and the development of the mass transit system.

If approved, construction is expected to start in 2028, with the first services starting in 2031, and the whole system completed by 2040. A report in September 2022 stated that two routes radiating from Bradford would be the first to be developed; Bradford to Dewsbury, and Bradford to Leeds.

Notes

References

External links
West Yorkshire Mass Transit vision

Transport in Leeds
Transport in West Yorkshire